San Fernando Creek is a river in Texas. Its mouth is in Baffin Bay in the Upper Laguna Madre.

See also
List of rivers of Texas

References

USGS Geographic Names Information Service
USGS Hydrologic Unit Map - State of Texas (1974)

Rivers of Texas